Transnistria is an unrecognised state that unilaterally split from Moldova after the dissolution of the USSR and mostly consists of a narrow strip of land between the river Dniester and the territory of Ukraine. 

In English, Transnistria refers to itself as Pridnestrovie, a Russian-language equivalent of Transnistria. It is usually officially referred to in Moldova as the Left Bank of the Dniester ( or ).

Transnistria may also refer to:

 Moldavian Soviet Socialist Republic, predecessor of modern Transnistria
 Transnistria Governorate, a governate of Romania during World War II
 Administrative-Territorial Units of the Left Bank of the Dniester, an administrative unit of the Republic of Moldova
 Transnistria conflict, an ongoing political conflict
 Transnistria War, the most violent phase of the Transnistria conflict
 , a village in the Ivano-Frankivsk Oblast in Ukraine